Sidi El Baghdadi Mosque is a  mosque in the south-west of the medina of Tunis.

Localization
It is at 15 Sidi El Baghdadi Street, near Bab Mnara, one of the gates of the medina.

History
According to the commemorative plaque at the entrance, the mosque was built in the 13th century, during the Hafsid era.

References

Mosques in Tunis
13th-century mosques